
Rumeli Feneri, also Türkeli Feneri, a historical lighthouse still in use, is located on the European side of the Bosporus Strait's Black Sea entrance in Istanbul.

Etymology
Rumeli (or Rumelia) is a former name for the Ottoman territories west of the Bosporus Strait. The lighthouse is named for it because of Anadolu Feneri, a lighthouse parallel to it on the eastern side of the Bosporus Strait.

Overview
In the Greek myth of Jason and the Golden Fleece, the two islets these lighthouses were built were called the Symplegades. They became a gang, destroying any ship which passed between them. A line connecting the two lighthouses marks the northern boundary of the Port of Istanbul. The lighthouse town is Rumelifeneri, which today is a fishermen's village in Sarıyer district.

The lighthouse was built by the French in order to provide safe navigation for the French and British war ships entering and exiting the Black Sea during the Crimean War (1853–1856). The lighthouse went into service on 15 May 1856, together with its Anatolian counterpart. It was operated by the French until 1933 when the 100-year concession was cancelled and the Turkish authorities took over. Today, it is maintained by the Coastal Safety Authority of the Ministry of Transport and Communication.

It is the tallest lighthouse in Turkey. The tower has the form of a two-staged octagonal prism. Initially, it was lit by kerosene that was later replaced by Dalén light using carbide (acetylene gas). Today, the light source is electricity; a butane gas lighting system is also installed for backup purposes.

The lighthouse is listed in Turkey under the code "TUR-053" and its radio call sign is TC1RLH.

Rumeli Feneri is open to the public as a historical site.

A Muslim saint by the name of Sarı Saltuk has a tomb inside the lighthouse.

See also

 List of lighthouses in Turkey

References

Notes

External links

 Directorate General of Coastal Safety

Lighthouses completed in 1856
Tourist attractions in Istanbul
Bosphorus
Lighthouses of the Black Sea
Lighthouses in Istanbul
Sarıyer